is a passenger railway station in located in the city of Yokosuka, Kanagawa, Japan, operated by East Japan Railway Company (JR East).

Lines
Kinugasa Station is served by the Yokosuka Line. It is located 19.3 km from Ōfuna Station, and 68.7 km from the Tokyo Station.

Station layout
The station consists of a single island platform connected to the station building by an underground passage. The station can accommodate trains of up to 11 cars long. Because the Yokosuka line is only one track between the neighboring Yokosuka Station and Kurihama station, trains stop at this station to allow other trains to pass. There was once a short holding track beside the station, but it has been removed. The station is staffed.In an effort to make the station barrier free,  a wheelchair-accessible toilet, Braille signs and elevators have been installed.

Platforms

History
Kinugasa Station opened on 1 April 1944 as a station on the Japan National Railways (JNR). Freight operations were discontinued from February 1, 1961. The station came under the management of JR East upon the privatization of the Japan National Railways (JNR) on April 1, 1987. Station operations are now managed by the East Japan Eco Access Co., Ltd under contract from JR East.

Station layout
Kinugasa Station has two tracks and a single island platforms connected to the station building by an underpass.

Passenger statistics
In fiscal 2019, the station was used by an average of 8,369 passengers daily (boarding passengers only).

The passenger figures (boarding passengers only) for previous years are as shown below.

Surrounding area
Kinugasa Castle Ruins
Kinugasa Hospital
Kanagawa Prefectural Yokosuka High School
Miura Gakuen High School (Private)
Yokosuka City Kinugasa Elementary School

See also
List of railway stations in Japan

References

External links

 JR East Station information (JR East) 

Railway stations in Kanagawa Prefecture
Railway stations in Japan opened in 1944
Yokosuka Line
Railway stations in Yokosuka, Kanagawa